Diporiphora phaeospinosa is a species of agama found in Australia.

References

Diporiphora
Agamid lizards of Australia
Taxa named by Jane Melville
Reptiles described in 2011